Circuit riding was one of the responsibilities of U.S. Supreme Court justices during the Marshall Court (1801–1835). Under the Judiciary Act of 1801, the United States federal judicial districts were divided into six (and later seven) United States circuit courts—one for each justice. Rather than appointing separate circuit judges (with the exception of the brief interlude under the soon-repealed Midnight Judges Act), the circuit courts were staffed by a combination of the resident United States district court judges from that district and the Supreme Court justice assigned to that circuit (either could preside alone or they could preside together).

While the circuits were the unit of circuit riding assignments, the individual circuit courts were referred to by the name of the judicial district (e.g. "United States Circuit Court for the District of New Hampshire," or, in case citations, C.C.D.N.H.).

Some districts were not within any circuit (for example, under the Judiciary Act of 1801: Maine, Kentucky, and Tennessee). These district courts exercised the powers of circuit courts, and appeals from the district court were possible only to the Supreme Court. Circuit riding did not occur within such districts.

History of the circuit courts
Judiciary Act of 1802, 2 Stat. 156
First circuit: New Hampshire, Massachusetts, and Rhode Island
Second circuit: Connecticut, New York, and Vermont
Third circuit: New Jersey and Pennsylvania
Fourth circuit: Maryland and Delaware
Fifth circuit: Virginia and North Carolina
Sixth circuit: South Carolina and Georgia
Act of Feb. 24, 1807, 2 Stat. 420
Seventh circuit created, consisting of the (pre-existing) Districts of Kentucky, Eastern Tennessee, Western Tennessee, and Ohio; one justice added to Supreme Court
Act of Apr. 9, 1814, 3 Stat. 120
District of New York divided into Northern and Southern Districts; circuit court held only in the Southern District; Northern District given the power of a circuit court
Act of Apr. 20, 1818, 3 Stat. 462
District of Pennsylvania divided into Eastern and Western Districts; circuit court held in both; Western District given power of a circuit court
Act of  Feb. 4, 1819, 3 Stat. 478
District of Virginia divided into Eastern and Western Districts; each given the power of a circuit court
Act of Mar. 30, 1820, 3 Stat. 554
District of Maine added to the first circuit

History of the assignments

References

Marshall Court